The Great Pumpkin is a fictional character from Charles M. Schulz's Peanuts (Charlie Brown) comic.

Great Pumpkin may also refer to:
Celestial bodies
Great Pumpkin (asteroid), nickname of asteroid 2015 TB145 that passed earth on 2015-10-31 (Halloween)
Films
 It's the Great Pumpkin, Charlie Brown (1966 telefilm), Halloween TV special, also called The "Great Pumpkin" TV special
 The Great Pumpkin (film), 1993 Italian film
Rides and attractions
 The Great Pumpkin Coaster, the roller coaster at Kings Island amusement park in Ohio

See also
 Giant pumpkin, the novelty record-contesting extremely large variety of pumpkin
 Pumpkin (disambiguation)